Piana may refer to

Places
In Italy
Piana Crixia, a comune 
Piana, Perugia, a comune 
Piana degli Albanesi, a comune 
Giffoni Valle Piana, a town and comune 
Calanques de Piana, an inlet 
Monte Piana, a mountain 
Piana degli Albanesi Cathedral 

Elsewhere
Piana, Arcadia, a village in Greece
Piana, Corse-du-Sud, a commune in France
Pyana, a river in Nizhny Novgorod Oblast and the Republic of Mordovia, Russia
Parque Luis Méndez Piana, a multi-use stadium in Uruguay

Other
Piana (moth), a synonym of the moth genus Crioa
Piana (surname)
Loro Piana, an Italian clothing company
Piana Clerico, a clothing company in Italy
Loro Piana TomBoy, a racing horse 
Piana Canova PC.500, a single-seat sailplane
Rich Piana, American bodybuilder and motivational speaker

See also
Piano (disambiguation)